The Philippine Ski and Snowboard Federation (PSSF), formerly the Philippine Ski Federation, is the governing body of snow skiing and snowboarding in the Philippines. The sporting body is based in Lakewood, California in the United States and is a member of the Fédération Internationale de Ski since 1971.

The organization is a full member of the Philippine Olympic Committee since 2022.

References

External links 

Philippine Ski and Snowboard Federation on the list of FIS members

Philippines
Ski
Skiing organizations